Pradan Baruah is an Indian politician who is member of Parliament and elected to 16th Lok Sabha from Lakhimpur seat since November 2016. He won the by-election in November 2016, after the seating member Sarbananda Sonowal resigned from the seat in May 2016 after becoming the Chief Minister of Assam. He was earlier the member of Assam Legislative Assembly from Dhemaji Assembly constituency (no. 113) in Dhemaji district.

He is a member of Bharatiya Janata Party. Previously, Baruah was member of Indian National Congress but defected from Congress before the assembly election along with Himanta Biswa Sarma in 2016.

References 

Living people
Bharatiya Janata Party politicians from Assam
People from Dhemaji district
Indian National Congress politicians
Assam MLAs 2016–2021
India MPs 2014–2019
1965 births
Lok Sabha members from Assam
India MPs 2019–present